Bethabara Moravian Church is a congregation of the Jamaica Province of the Moravian Church. It opened for worship on 1841-07-28.

History
Moravian work in the vicinity began in 1827 as an outstation of Fairfield and continued until 1837 when the adherents were sent to join New Broughton or Ebenezer (both Presbyterian). In 1839 the minister of Fairfield resumed the work (at the request of the adherents) with services held in a leaky building at Isles. The ground breaking for the present church building was on 1840-01-16.

An elementary school was established in 1846 (in the church building initially) and an infant school in 1863.

Bethlehem Moravian College started here in 1861, closing in 1887 (after twenty six years) preparatory to the move to Malvern.

Patrick Town (1882) and Sharon (1950s) started as outstations of Bethabara. Broadleaf is at present Bethabara's only outstation.

The Newport Branch Library had its origin in the church building (1950s).

The congregation hosted the provincial synods of 1983 and 1989.

Buildings

Church
A cut stone and mortar structure with a small wooden belfry to the front. The exterior of the building was rendered and painted late in the 20th century.

A pipe organ was obtained from Germany in the early 1890s.

Manse

The manse is rumoured to have been an overseers house on the Isle sugar estate prior to the construction of the church. Be that as it may, it is a substantial structure in traditional style with a stone built ground floor (used for storage) below the wooden living quarters on the first floor.

Rain water was channelled by gutters from the roof to a large storage tank to the north of the building from where it was daily pumped by hand into a header tank and gravity fed to taps.

To the rear (east) of the building was a row of outbuildings which formed one side of a small courtyard. These were removed during the 1980s.

Schools

The original infant school was to the left at the rear of the church with the junior school to the church's front right. Since these photographs were taken the infant building has been abandoned and the junior building replaced with a much larger structure.

Moravian Deaconess House
Opened on 1971-07-28 by Bishop Hastings.

Burial ground
Adjacent to the church is a large and well used God's Acre of about 5000m2.

Ministry
Several Bethabara men went on to serve as Ministers of the Moravian Church including S J Swaby, Trevor Dawkins, Livingstone and Paul Thompson (brothers) and Robert Cuthbert who entered the ministry while his father was serving Bethabara.

S J Swaby, Robert Cuthbert, Livingstone Thompson and Paul Thompson have served the PEC as Secretary, President and Secretary.

Vivian Moses was consecrated as a bishop while serving in North America.

Ministers

Reference:

F P Wilde's 48 years at Bethabara (and one year elsewhere) remains the longest service in Jamaica by a Moravian minister.

References

Bibliography
.
.
.

External links
Aerial view of the church.
Aerial view of the manse.
Aerial view of the burial ground.

Congregations of Jamaica Province of the Moravian Church
Moravian churches in Jamaica
1827 establishments in the British Empire
Churches completed in 1814